Daniel Olesker (born August 23, 1952 in Montevideo) is an Uruguayan politician of the Socialist Party – Broad Front. He served as Minister of Social Development from 2011 to 2015 and as Minister of Public Health between 2010 and 2011. Since February 15, 2020, he has served as Senator of the Republic.

Biography

Early life and education 
He was born to a Jewish family on August 23, 1952. His father, Bernardo Olesker was honorary president of the Zionist Organization of Uruguay. 

Studied economy at the University of the Republic but did not graduate. Began his political militancy at age 18, in the March 26 Movement, a left-leaning Marxist–Leninist group. Due to his political activities, he was imprisoned for three and a half years. He lived in Belgium, where he completed a postgraduate degree at the Université catholique de Louvain.

Career 
He teaches grade 5 Faculty of Economics and holder of the area of Labor Economics. He is a member of the Network of World Economy, Political Economy Workshop and Working Group on Global Economy of the Latin American Council of Science, where he also teaches courses in labor economics.

He served as Minister of Social Development from 2011 to 2015, during the administration of José Mujica. Previously he served as Minister of Public Health (2010-2011). In the 2019 general election, he was elected Senator of the Republic for the 49th Legislature, a position he accessed on February 15, 2020.

Bibliography

References

Living people
1952 births
Jewish Uruguayan politicians
Broad Front (Uruguay) politicians
Socialist Party of Uruguay politicians
University of the Republic (Uruguay) alumni
Université catholique de Louvain alumni
Uruguayan economists
Ministers of Social Development of Uruguay
Ministers for Public Health of Uruguay
Uruguayan Zionists